Mystery of the Snow Pearls is a 1985 adventure module for the Dungeons & Dragons roleplaying game.  Its associated code is CM5 and the TSR product number is TSR 9154.

Synopsis 
Mystery of the Snow Pearls is a solo adventure scenario for one player character who will need to answer the riddles of an evil mage to get back the magic pearl that keeps the character's village safe; the adventure can also be adapted to use with a party of player characters.

The player character is a Companion level elf, responsible for safeguarding one of the four, magical pearls that protect the land of Tarylon. Milgo, an evil wizard with a sense of humour, challenges the elf to find and return the lost item. Without it, the entire region is threatened.

This adventure includes a piece of colored film known as a "Magic Viewer" that allows the players to read the hidden results of their choices in the text. This includes encounters, puzzles, and traps.

Publication history

Mystery of the Snow Pearls was written by Anne Gray McCready, with a cover by Larry Elmore, and was published by TSR in 1985 as a 32-page booklet with an outer folder, and also includes a large map and colored film.

Reception

See also
 List of Dungeons & Dragons modules

Further reading
Review: The V.I.P. of Gaming Magazine #2 (1986)

References

External links

The "CM" modules from The Acaeum

Dungeons & Dragons modules
Mystara
Role-playing game supplements introduced in 1985